

Calendar

Preliminary round

Group A 

Note: All times are local

Group B 

Note: All times are local

Medal Round 
Iran withdrew because of the possibility of a match against Israel.

Source: Paralympic.org  

Quarterfinals

Semifinals

Bronze medal game

Gold medal game

Classification 5-8 

Source: Paralympic.org  

Classification

Fifth place

Seventh place

Classification 9-12 

Source: Paralympic.org  

Classification

Ninth place

Eleventh place

Ranking

References 

 

Wheelchair basketball at the 2008 Summer Paralympics